Cavergno is a village in the district of Vallemaggia, in the canton of Ticino, Switzerland. On 22 October 2006 Cavergno lost its status as an independent municipality when together with the village of Bignasco it was incorporated into the municipality of Cevio.

References

 Swiss Federal Statistics Office

External links
 

Former municipalities of Ticino